The 1996–97 Scottish Football League Third Division was the 3rd season in the format of ten teams in the fourth-tier of Scottish football. The season started on 17 August 1996 and ended on 10 May 1997. Inverness Caledonian Thistle finished top and were promoted alongside runners-up Forfar Athletic. Arbroath finished bottom.

Teams for 1996–97

Livingston as champions of the previous season were directly promoted to the 1996–97 Scottish Second Division alongside runners-up Brechin City, both spending only one season in the bottom tier of the Scottish Football League. They were replaced by Forfar Athletic and Montrose who finished second bottom and bottom of the 1994–95 Scottish Second Division respectively and relegated straight back down to the Third Division after only a year in the Second Division. During the change of season Caledonian Thistle changed their name to Inverness Caledonian Thistle for the 1996–97 season.

Overview
Relegated from Second Division to the Third Division
 Forfar Athletic
 Montrose

Promoted from Third Division to the Second Division
 Livingston
 Brechin City

Stadia and locations

Table

References

External links 
Official site
1996/1997 Scottish Third Division at Soccerway
Scottish Football Archive

Scottish Third Division seasons
Scot
4